Laquinimod is an experimental immunomodulator developed by Active Biotech and Teva. It is being investigated as an oral treatment for multiple sclerosis (MS).

Laquinimod is the successor of Active Biotech's failed experimental immunomodulator linomide.

The compound has been investigated in two Phase II trials using successive magnetic resonance scans (MRI). Laquinimod seems to be able to reduce the MS disease activity on MRI. However, the response to a given dose was discrepant between both studies.

Phase III studies for MS started in December 2007. In 2011, Teva announced its clinical trials involving laquinimod had failed, being unable to significantly reduce relapses in MS among patients beyond a placebo. However, the final results of above-mentioned phase III trial proved oral laquinimod administered once daily slowed the progression of disability and reduced the rate of relapse in patients with relapsing–remitting multiple sclerosis.

On May 7, 2013 laquinimod was approved by the Russian Ministry of Health (the FDA analog) as a treatment for relapsing-remitting multiple sclerosis (RRMS) under the brand name Nerventra.

See also
 Management of multiple sclerosis

References

External links
 Entries in NIH Study Registry

Immunosuppressants